Denbigh is an unincorporated community in McHenry County, North Dakota, United States.

History
A post office was established in 1900, and remained in operation until 1988. The community took its name after Denbigh, in Wales.

It is listed as the nearest community to Norway Lutheran Church and Cemetery, which is actually 10 miles south, and which is listed on the National Register of Historic Places.

References

Unincorporated communities in McHenry County, North Dakota
Unincorporated communities in North Dakota